Shahrukh Ki Saliyan is a Pakistani romantic comedy series produced by Abdullah Kadwani and Asad Qureshi under 7th Sky Entertainment. It features Ahsan Khan and Ramsha Khan in lead roles. It first aired on 8 June 2019.

Cast
 Ahsan Khan as Shahrukh Rao
 Ramsha Khan as Anoushay
 Aruba Mirza as Kitty
 Arez Ahmed as Abu Bakr
 Raza Zaidi as Glucose
 Rehan Sheikh as Havildar Maula Baksh
 Jawed Sheikh as Professor Rao (Shahrukh's father)
 Hina Khawaja Bayat as Mrs Rao (Shahrukh's mother)
 Faiza Ali as Mikky 
 Namra Shahid as Nighar
 Ali Ansari as Dildar

Awards and Nomination

References

External links
Official website

2019 Pakistani television series debuts
Geo TV original programming
Pakistani drama television series